The (Chinese) Patriot Alliance Association (Chinese: 愛國同心會), abbreviated PAA, also known as the Concentric Patriotism Alliance (Chinese: 中華愛國同心會) or the Concentric Patriotism Association of China is a pro-Chinese Communist Party organization that supports the unification of Taiwan and China.

The organization was founded in 1993 and has been subjected to multiple public complaints of harassment and aggression. Because of this, its members have been informally labeled "Communist thugs in Taiwan". Previous attacks by members of the PAA have targeted Falun Gong-practitioners in front of the Taipei 101 square in 2010.

Zhang Xiuye is a founding member of the Chinese Patriotic Alliance Association. She was born in Shanghai, married a Taiwanese and then moved to Taiwan around 1993, after which she and her husband divorced. According to some sources, Zhang is considered the leader of the PAA. She has been sued in Taiwan for aggravated slander.

Another member of the PAA is the Vietnamese-born Su An-sheng, who had reportedly kicked the former President of Taiwan, Chen Shui-bian, in the back.

In July 2022, the Taipei District Prosecutors’ Office disclosed that the PAA's attempts to influence Taiwanese politics were funded by the Taiwan Affairs Office in China. Wanted notices were issued for Lin Ming-mei, the wife of former party chairman Chou Ching-chun, and the party's secretary-general, Zhang Xiuye.

See also 
United Front in Taiwan

References

External links 
Taiwan: Spies, Lies and Cross-straits Ties. People and Power, Al Jazeera English, September 2018
J. Michael Cole: China Acting on ‘Lebanonization’ Threat Against Taiwan. Taiwan Sentinel, 8 May 2018

Organizations associated with the Chinese Communist Party
Political parties in Taiwan
Chinese nationalist political parties
United front (China)